The 2011 Old Dominion Monarchs football team represented Old Dominion University in the 2011 NCAA Division I FCS football season. The Monarchs were led by third-year head coach Bobby Wilder and played their home games at Foreman Field at S. B. Ballard Stadium. They were in their first year as a member of the Colonial Athletic Association. They finished the season 10–3, 6–2 in CAA play, to finish in a three-way tie for second place. They received an at-large bid into the FCS playoffs, their first ever playoff berth, where they defeated Norfolk State in the first round before falling to Georgia Southern in the second round.

Schedule

Post season awards
 All-CAA 1st team Offense – WR Nick Mayers
 All-CAA 1st team Defense – DL Ronnie Cameron, LB Craig Wilkins, P Jonathan Plisco
 All-CAA 2nd team Defense – CB Eriq Lewis
 All-CAA 3rd team Offense – QB Taylor Heinicke, WR & PR Reid Evans, OL Jeremy Hensley, PK Jarod Brown
 All-CAA 3rd team Defense – DL Chris Burnette
 Ronnie Cameron – CAA Defensive Player of the Year, seven total All-American Awards (three first team selections, fourth second team selections), 2011 CFPA Elite Defensive tackle Award
 Jonathan Plisco – six All-American Awards 
 Taylor Heinicke – National Freshman Performer of the Year

References

Old Dominion
Old Dominion Monarchs football seasons
Old Dominion
Old Dominion Monarchs football